Fanshawe College of Applied Arts and Technology, commonly shortened to Fanshawe College, is a public college in Southwestern Ontario, Canada. One of the largest colleges in Canada, it has campuses in London, Simcoe, St. Thomas and Woodstock with additional locations in Southwestern Ontario. Fanshawe has approximately 43,000 students and provides over 200 higher education programs.

History
In 1962, the Ontario Vocational Centre (OVC) was founded in London, Ontario, and held its first classes on September 28, 1964. In 1967, it became Fanshawe College, part of a provincial system of applied arts and technology colleges. Fanshawe subsequently established campuses in Woodstock, St. Thomas, and Simcoe. The London campus originally consisted of three buildings, but has since been subject to a series of extensions. The college's name has old English origins, combining words fane (meaning temple or building) and shaw or shawe (meaning woods) to mean "temple in the woods".

James A. Colvin was named Fanshawe College's first president in 1967 and held the position until 1979, when he was succeeded by Harry Rawson, who served as president until his retirement in 1987. Barry Moore was the third president from 1987 to 1996. Howard Rundle, Fanshawe's longest-serving president, subsequently led the college for 18 years until his retirement on August 31, 2013. Peter Devlin became president of the college on September 3, 2013, and previously served as a lieutenant general in the Canadian Army.

The Fanshawe College Arboretum was established in 1995.

In May 2011, the college opened its Centre for Applied Transportation Technologies, with a capacity of 1,500 students. The college established the Norton Wolf School of Aviation Technology after purchasing Jazz Aviation facilities at London International Airport in August 2013.

In 2014, Fanshawe announced that it would purchase the building of the recently closed Kingsmill's Department Store for expansion of its downtown London campus with a request for an additional grant of $10 million from City Council. The request proved politically contentious in a municipal election year with it being initially refused by Council following a tie vote on July 29. However, after the local organization, Downtown London, put up $1 million in support of this initiative, London City Council narrowly voted to approve the remainder of the funding after minor additional contract changes in its favor.

In September 2014, Fanshawe College established its School of Public Safety, to provide public safety programs. The school received  premises in September 2016. In June 2016, Fanshawe opened its Canadian Centre for Product Validation (CCPV), a  testing facility. 

On April 27, 2015, the family of the late Don Smith, the co-founder of EllisDon, announced that the School of Building Technology would be renamed the Donald J. Smith School of Building Technology in his honor. Don was the first recipient of a Fanshawe College honorary diploma in 1992. In 2008, Fanshawe presented his wife, Joan, with an honorary diploma.

In 2018, Fanshawe established its fifth school, the School of Digital and Performing Arts, offering creative programs previously offered by the School of Contemporary Media and School of Design.

130 Dundas Street opened in September 2018. The new building is home to 1,600 students from the School of Information Technology and the School of Tourism, Hospitality and Culinary Arts.

Programs
Fanshawe offers more than 200 degree, diploma, certificate and apprenticeship programs to 43,000 students each year.

The College has 15 academic schools: Donald J. Smith School of Building Technology; Lawrence Kinlin School of Business; Norton Wolf School of Aviation and Aerospace Technology; School of Applied Science and Technology; School of Community Studies; School of Contemporary Media; School of Design; School of Digital and Performing Arts; School of Health Sciences; School of Information Technology; School of Language and Liberal Studies; School of Nursing; School of Public Safety; School of Tourism, Hospitality and Culinary Arts; and School of Transportation Technology and Apprenticeship.

Athletics

Fanshawe College joined the Ontario College Athletic Association (OCAA) in 1967 as one of the six founding members. The Falcons currently compete in 14 varsity sports, with 19 teams including: men's and women's basketball, men's and women's volleyball, men's and women's indoor and outdoor soccer, men's and women's golf, men's and women's badminton, men's and women's cross-country, men's baseball, women's softball and men's and women's and mixed curling.

Many of Fanshawe's varsity programs excel not only in the OCAA but also the Canadian Colleges Athletic Association (CCAA).  As of the 2021/22 season, the Falcons have a total of 22 national championships, 152 provincial championships and a total of 432 medals.

Fanshawe Athletics set a Fanshawe record totals for most medals in a season in 2018/19 with 28 overall medals. The Falcons led the Ontario Colleges Athletic Association (OCAA), winning 11 OCAA Championships this season to go along with 21 OCAA medals. The 11 championships shattered Fanshawe's own record of six from 2017/18. Fanshawe Athletics also set a new school record for most national medals in a single season (7). The 2018–19 season saw Fanshawe win two Canadian Collegiate Athletic Association (CCAA) National Championships, 5 national bronze, 11 provincial gold, 6 provincial silver and 4 provincial bronze medals.

Additionally, Fanshawe has one of the largest campus recreation programs in Ontario with over 4500 students participating in intramurals, extramural and open recreation every year.

Campuses

London Campus 

The London Campus also includes the School of Transportation Technology and Apprenticeship and the Norton Wolf School of Aviation Technology. The London campus has been described as "one of the largest in Ontario" and as a "city within a city".

London Downtown Campus 
Fanshawe's London Downtown Campus was established in 2018. It has three buildings, located at 431 Richmond Street (Access Studies), 130 Dundas Street (Schools of Information Technology and Tourism, Hospitality and Culinary Arts) and 137 Dundas Street (School of Digital and Performing Arts).

London South Campus 
Fanshawe's newest campus, London South, is located at 1060 Wellington Rd. South. The newly renovated building opened in September 2019 and hosts five programs currently, Business Management, Business and Information Systems Architecture, Agri-Business Management, Health Care Administration Management and Retirement Residence Management. The campus was formerly a Westervelt College campus, which closed in 2017.

St. Thomas/Elgin Regional Campus 

The St. Thomas/Elgin Regional Campus, located in the southeast end of St. Thomas, Ontario, is home to approximately 350 full-time students and 2,000 part-time students. The Campus offers certificate and diploma programs, academic upgrading, apprenticeships, continuing education, corporate training, and career and employment services.

Simcoe/Norfolk Regional Campus 
The Simcoe/Norfolk Regional Campus, located in a part of Ontario, is home to almost 200 full-time students and hundreds more part-time students. The Campus offers certificate, diploma and graduate certificate programs, academic upgrading, continuing education, corporate training and career and employment services. Full-time programs that are unique to this campus are Adventure Expeditions and Interpretive Leadership, Developmental Services Worker (Accelerated) and Early Childhood Education (Accelerated). It was the first Fanshawe campus to offer the Agri-Business Management graduate certificate program.

Woodstock/Oxford Regional Campus 
The Woodstock/Oxford Regional Campus, located at the forks of Highways 401 and 403, is home to approximately 450 full-time students and 2,000 part-time students. The Campus offers certificate and diploma programs, apprenticeships, academic upgrading, continuing education, corporate training and more. Full-time programs that are unique to this campus are Business – Entrepreneurship and Management, Hair Stylist, Police Foundations (Accelerated) and Heating, Refrigeration and Air Conditioning Technician.

Huron/Bruce Regional Sites 

Fanshawe has been in the central Huron/Bruce area, north of London, since approximately 2007. Currently programs are held at the Bruce Technology Skills and Training Centre.

Student government 
The Fanshawe Student Union (FSU) is a student representative body, designed to meet the various needs and expectations of students attending Fanshawe College. The FSU has had a student newspaper since its inception, first known as Fanfare, changing to The Dam in 1971. It has been known as The Interrobang since approximately 1979 and is Fanshawe's only student newspaper. It is published biweekly from September to April and distributed on-campus free of charge throughout Fanshawe College. The Interrobang, is a member of Canadian University Press.

Notable alumni 

 David Willsie, Paralympic athlete 
 Damian Warner, Gold medal decathlete in 2020 Tokyo Games and bronze medal winner in Athletics at the 2016 Olympics in Rio de Janeiro 
 Caroline Cameron, television sportscaster  
 Les Stroud, musician, filmmaker, and survival expert best known for TV series Survivorman 
 Brad Long, chef
 Cheryl Hickey, host of ET Canada
 Trevor Morris, orchestral composer and music producer
 Emm Gryner, singer-songwriter and actress 
 Steven Sabados, television show host, interior designer and writer 
 Kelley Armstrong, writer 
 Anne Marie DeCicco-Best, longest-serving mayor of London, Ontario
 Carol Mitchell, politician
 Greg Brady, radio and sports broadcaster
 William Peter Randall, musician and politician
 Nathan Robitaille, sound editor
 Ted Roop, radio and media personality
 Bruce Smith, Ontario politician 
 Sam Stout, retired professional Mixed Martial Artist formerly with the UFC
 Glenn Thibeault, politician 
 Maria Van Bommel, Ontario politician 
 Jeff Willmore, artist
 Craig Mann – Oscar-winning re–recording mixer 
 Dana Lewis – award-winning television news correspondent

Notable faculty
 Gerald Fagan – choral conductor, honorary diploma recipient, former faculty member and Member of the Order of Canada.
Jack Richardson – legendary record producer for Canadian rockers The Guess Who (1969–1975) and many others artists such as Bob Seger and Alice Cooper. Richardson was appointed to the Order of Canada in 2003.
Moe Berg – Canadian singer-songwriter and record producer, former lead singer of the band The Pursuit of Happiness, and now professor in the Music Industry Arts program.
 Dan Brodbeck – Canadian record producer, recording engineer/mixer and professor in the Music Industry Arts program. Brodbeck was nominated for a 2020 Grammy Award in the Best Rock Album category for his work on the Irish alternative rock group's The Cranberries' final album, In The End.

See also
 Higher education in Ontario
 List of colleges in Ontario

References

 
Educational institutions established in 1967
1967 establishments in Ontario